Bhuvad  is a village of Ahir [Zaru] And Rathod or rathore Rajput Kshatriya in Anjar Taluka of Kutch district of Gujarat, India.

History

Bhuvad has a much ruined temple of Bhuvadeshvar Mahadev, whose hall, mandap, measuring 31 feet by 39 inside, is supported by 64 pillars and 4 pilasters, 18 on the screen wall and 12 round the dome. The pillars are square to about one-third their height, then octagonal, and lastly round. The shrine has been large, fully 23 feet square, domed on 12 pilasters, 18 inches by 12, with four-armed figures on the brackets. The brackets of the hall columns are plain, but above the bracket a plinth, nine or ten inches deep, is carved with a raised geometrical pattern, The fronts of the brackets are carved. The walls of the temple are of stone throughout. Over the shrine door is a Devi, probably Bhavani. On the pilasters to the right of the shrine is an inscription dated 1289-90 (Samvat 1346); of which all that is now legible are the names of Vanaram and a few other Thakors, probably his ancestors. Bhuvad, who gave its name to the village, is said to have been a Chavda chief, killed either by the Kathis or by Lakha Phulani Jadeja about 1320: His headless body is said to have fought its way to Bhuvad, where is a shrine with a red-painted headless figure. Near his shrine are tall tombstones, said to have been raised over warriors who fell in the battle in which Bhuvad was slain.

Demographics
The village, apart from.  Ahir And RathodRajput kshatriyas and  families of Zaru and also has a significant proportion of the population belonging to the Rabari and Patidar communities. The Leva Patidar of village Bhuvad have adopted the Bhudia / Bhudya surname after their ancestral village Bhuvad. The Padharia community of Kutch also have a Kuldevi temple at the village.

References

Villages in Kutch district